A Cross fluid is a type of generalized Newtonian fluid whose viscosity depends upon shear rate according to the following equation:

where  is viscosity as a function of shear rate,  and n are coefficients.

The zero-shear viscosity  is approached at very low shear rates, while the infinite shear viscosity  is approached at very high shear rates.

See also
Navier-Stokes equations
Fluid
Carreau fluid
Power-law fluid
Generalized Newtonian fluid

References

Kennedy, P. K., Flow Analysis of Injection Molds. New York. Hanser. 

Non-Newtonian fluids